Private John E. Clopp (1845 to April 6, 1866) was an American soldier who fought in the American Civil War. Clopp received the country's highest award for bravery during combat, the Medal of Honor, for his action during the Battle of Gettysburg in Pennsylvania on 3 July 1863. He was honored with the award on 2 February 1865.

Biography
Clopp was born in Philadelphia, Pennsylvania in 1845. He enlisted into the 71st Pennsylvania Infantry. He died on 6 April 1866 and his remains are interred at the Lawnview Memorial Park in Rockledge, Pennsylvania.

Medal of Honor citation

See also

List of Medal of Honor recipients for the Battle of Gettysburg
List of American Civil War Medal of Honor recipients: A–F

References

1845 births
1866 deaths
People of Pennsylvania in the American Civil War
Union Army officers
United States Army Medal of Honor recipients
American Civil War recipients of the Medal of Honor
Burials at Lawnview Memorial Park
Military personnel from Philadelphia